"Do No Wrong" is a song by Cornish alternative rock band Thirteen Senses, from their debut album The Invitation. It was the first single to be released from that album in the United Kingdom on 31 May 2004. It reached number 38 on the UK Singles Chart.

Track listings
CD 1 (2004)
 Do No Wrong (Edit) [4:02]
 Little Unrest  [4:40]

CD 2 (2004)
 Do No Wrong (Album Version) [5:04]
 The Questions  [5:04]
 Control  [2:32]
 Do No Wrong (Video) [4:02]

7-inch (2004)
 Do No Wrong (Album Version) [5:04]
 Attracting Submission [1:57]

References

Thirteen Senses songs
2004 singles
Mercury Records singles
2004 songs